Bolette-Merete Sutermeister Petri (October 23, 1920 – 2018) was a Danish-Swiss writer of travel literature, considered as ″expert for the High North".

Biography 

Petri Sutermeister was born in October 1920 in Kriens, Switzerland. Her mother was Danish and her father was the owner of a pasta producer in Lucerne; she spent her first eight years of life in the ″villa Bleiche″ in Kriens; then she lived with her family in Lucerne; In 1935 she moved with her mother after her divorce to Copenhagen. At sixteen, she first traveled to Spitsbergen.

She worked as a translator in Copenhagen and made archeological studies and expeditions to Greenland, Lapland and Spitsbergen. In Longyearbyen, she created in the former coal mine of John Munroe Longyear a museum ″with facts about Svalbard″. Until 1992, she spent each summer, from May to September in Spitsbergen.

Petri Sutermeister's books consist of stories that usually contain a trip /travel, for example, in a train or on a plane, containing and focus on landscape descriptions. Her most famous work is Eisblumen: Encounters on Spitsbergen. She died in 2018 at the age of 97.

References

External links 
 
 

1920 births
2018 deaths
Danish women writers
Svalbard
Swiss writers
Swiss emigrants to Denmark
Danish expatriates in Norway
People from Lucerne-Land District